Kintaqa is a genus of southeast Asian cellar spiders erected in 2018 for five species moved from Pholcus after a molecular phylogenetic study. They are medium sized spiders, distinguished by the unique enlarged shape of fourth segment of pedipalps.

The name honors the Kintaq, a Thai ethnic group.

Species
 it contains five species:
K. buatong (Huber, 2016) (type) – Thailand
K. fuza (Yao & Li, 2017) – Thailand
K. mueangensis (Yao & Li, 2017) – Thailand
K. satun (Huber, 2011) – Thailand, Malaysia
K. schwendingeri (Huber, 2011) – Thailand

See also
 Pholcus
 List of Pholcidae species

References

Further reading
 

Pholcidae genera
Spiders of Asia